Nick Scali Furniture is a publicly listed, manufacturing Australian company that retails and imports furniture such as lounges, dining tables, coffee tables, chairs and entertainment units. Nick Scali Furniture was founded in 1962 by Nick D. Scali.

The company specialises in leather and fabric lounges, as well as dining room and bedroom furniture. Nick Scali imports more than 5,000 containers of furniture per year worldwide, with showrooms and distribution centres across Australia.

Nick Scali Ltd core brands include Nick Scali Furniture, Nick Scali Online and Sofas2Go.

Corporate directors 
 John Ingram – Non-Executive chairman
 Anthony Scali – managing director
 Catrina Damasceno – non-executive director
 Greg Laurie – non-executive director
 Nick Scali – non-executive director

Founder 
Nick D. Scali, the founder of Nick Scali Furniture, continues to serve as a consultant to the company and is considered to be a pioneer and innovator in the import and retail of furniture in Australia and New Zealand. Over the years, he served on a number of public company boards, founded other enterprises and has made major contributions towards the Italian community within Australia. Mr. Scali has been non-executive director of Nick Scali Limited since 20 July 1962.

Stores and distribution centres 
As at 30 June 2016 the total number of showrooms was 47 and 6 distribution centres under Nick Scali Ltd, and the company continues to expand Australia-wide and into New Zealand.

Company information 
The Company has most recently reported a sales revenue increase of 30.4% for the Financial Year 2016, reaching $203 million. The Company's gross margin sits at 60.8% for the Financial Year 2016 and is indicative of a preferred Company trend, given the previous years' gross margin was 60.7%.

References

External links

Companies listed on the Australian Securities Exchange
Retail companies established in 1962
Companies based in Sydney
Furniture retailers of Australia
Furniture retailers of New Zealand
Australian brands
Australian companies established in 1962